Gesualdo "Aldo" Penna (27 May 1924 – 25 September 2000) was an Italian sprinter, who was 8th in the 100 m at the 1950 European Athletics Championships. 

National champion at senior level in 100 m in 1949.

Achievements

Honors
 Italian National Olympic Committee (CONI)

See also
 Italy at the 1950 European Athletics Championships

References

External links
 In ricordo di Aldo Penna – azzurro d'Italia 

1924 births
2000 deaths
Place of death missing
Italian male sprinters
Sportspeople from Reggio Calabria